The  or Menashi-Kunashir battle, was a battle in 1789 between Ainu and Wajin on the Shiretoko Peninsula in Northeastern Hokkaido. It began in May 1789 when Ainu attacked Wajin on Kunashir Island and parts of the Menashi District as well as at sea. More than 70 Wajin were killed. The Wajin executed 37 Ainu identified as conspirators and arrested many others. The reasons for the revolt are not entirely clear, but they are believed to include a suspicion of poisoned sake being given to Ainu in a loyalty ceremony and other objectionable behavior by Wajin traders.

The battle is the subject of Majin no Umi, a children's novel by Maekawa Yasuo that received the Japanese Association of Writers for Children Prize in 1970.

A similar large-scale Ainu revolt against Wajin influence in Yezo was Shakushain's Revolt from c. 1669–1672.

References

Brett L. Walker, The Conquest of Ainu Lands: Ecology and Culture in Japanese Expansion 1590–1800. University of California Press, 2001, pages 172–176.
Takakura Shinichirō and John A. Harrison, "The Ainu of Northern Japan: A Study in Conquest and Acculturation" in Transactions of the American Philosophical Society, New Series, Vol. 50, No. 4 (1960), pp. 1–88

External links
English-language page about Majin no Umi

Conflicts in 1789
1789 in Japan
18th-century rebellions
Kunashir Island
Hokkaido region
Rebellions in Japan
Ainu history
Asian resistance to colonialism
Genocides in Asia